Ghost Rider (Daniel "Danny" Ketch) is a fictional character appearing in American comic books published by Marvel Comics. He is the third Marvel character to don the identity of Ghost Rider, after Johnny Blaze (the first supernatural Ghost Rider and brother to Danny) and the Western hero known as the Phantom Rider, who used the name in 1967.

Publication history 

The third Ghost Rider debuted in Ghost Rider vol. 3 #1 (May 1990). The series ended with a cliffhanger in vol. 3 #93 (Feb. 1998). Marvel finally published the long-awaited final issue nine years later as Ghost Rider Finale (Jan. 2007), which reprints vol. 3 #93 and the previously unpublished #94. Ketch appears in the current Ghost Rider series alongside Johnny Blaze. In support of the series, Ketch received his own miniseries titled Ghost Rider: Danny Ketch, written by Simon Spurrier.

Fictional character biography 
Daniel Ketch was born in Brooklyn, New York. One night, Daniel and his sister Barbara were attacked by gangsters; with his sister grievously wounded by Deathwatch, Daniel fled and hid in a junkyard, where he found a motorcycle bearing a mystical sigil. Upon touching the sigil, he was transformed into the Ghost Rider. This Ghost Rider was nearly identical to the previous, though his costume and bike had undergone a modernized tailoring. He beat the gangsters, but was unable to save Barbara, who had slipped into a coma as a result from her injury. She was eventually killed by Blackout, whom Ketch had acquired as a mortal enemy.

Ketch later learned the origin of Zarathos from the mystical dream lord Nightmare, who believed the entity to which Ketch was bound was Zarathos reborn and freed from the Soul Crystal. Ghost Rider denied this, though others, including Mephisto, believed otherwise.

Alliances and deaths 
When Ghost Rider becomes a part of the team the Midnight Sons, he dies twice. The first person who killed Ghost Rider was the vampire hunter Blade, who was at the time possessed by the mystical book the Darkhold. He was soon revived by the Darkhold Redeemers, along with everyone else killed by Blade. The second time Daniel Ketch was killed was by Zarathos, but, as previously, was resurrected.

Ketch and Johnny Blaze later learned they were long-lost brothers and that their family was the inheritor of a mystical curse related to the Spirits of Vengeance. Danny Ketch seemed to die by the hand of Blackout, but the Spirit of Vengeance to which he had been bound through the bike's talisman lived on. During this time Ketch's only existence remained inside a void and he was only able to communicate with Ghost Rider via the spirit world.

Rebirth 
In Peter Parker: Spider-Man #93, Ghost Rider is seen being summoned forth on the streets of New York, his powers out of control due to lacking a host. He encounters Spider-Man and Ketch, who tells him that he is Noble Kale even though Ghost Rider denies this, and should be in Mephisto's realm. The trio contend with a bomb created by a group of terrorists who wish to incinerate the city. Although Ghost Rider takes possession of the bomb, he lacks the strength to contain the impending explosion, and thus Ketch rejoins with him to become Ghost Rider once more, and aids Spider-Man in neutralizing the threat.

This Ketch/Kale hybrid version of Ghost Rider eventually becomes the King of Hell in a brokered arrangement with then-ruler Blackheart. In return for Ghost Rider coming to Hell and marrying two hand-picked demon brides, Pao Fu and the Black Rose, Blackheart will free the Ketch line from the curse. Kale accepts. On the night after the dual wedding, Black Rose betrays Kale and tries to kill him. When she fails, Blackheart revealed that the entire arrangement had been a plan to kill Kale and destroy his soul. Black Rose is revealed to be Roxanne Simpson, the supposedly dead wife of Johnny Blaze. In response, Kale kills Blackheart, becomes King of Hell, and learns he is in fact the angel of death.

Ketch slipped into a coma in the mortal plane and was later revived by his dead mother, Naomi Kale-Blaze, and brother, Johnny Blaze, and goes on to live a seemingly normal life. However, his longtime girlfriend Stacy Dolan learns she is pregnant with Ketch's child and runs away.

2000s 
In the 2008 miniseries Ghost Rider: Danny Ketch, Ketch is tormented that his life has fallen apart due to his family curse, and thus has the Noble Kale Ghost Rider exorcised from his body by the technomancer Mary LeBow. Ketch falls into a deep alcoholic depression. He is repeatedly approached by Mister Eleven, a talking crow who gives him "doses" of the Ghost Rider power and reveals to him the history of the Spirits of Vengeance and how some past Ghost Riders were unable to cope with the Rider's power, which drove them insane and burned out their souls. Mister Eleven also explains that Verminus Rex, from Blackheart's old Spirit of Vengeance, is hunting other Spirits of Vengeance. Ketch vanquishes Rex, and absorbs the spirits Rex had taken in the past, but this drives Ketch insane. Zadkiel intervenes and absorbs the other Spirits of Vengeance from Ketch's soul, upon which Ketch becomes a knight in Zadkiel's service.

2010s
In a 2014 story, Ketch is briefly consulted by Otto Octavius regarding his old foe Blackout, who had just kidnapped May Parker. After informing Spider-Man of Blackout's abilities and weaknesses, Ketch tells him how evil and cruel the half-demon is, referencing Barbara's death at his hands. He advises Spider-Man to kill Blackout if he gets the chance.

During Absolute Carnage, Johnny, now the new King of Hell, convinced Daniel to go help another fellow Spirit of Vengeance, Alejandra Jones. In his Ghost Rider form, he arrived at Alejandra's village where he found her battling Dark Carnage. He tried to help her, but Carnage eventually killed her, after ripping and devouring her spine. Ketch tried to get revenge, but Carnage got empowered by Jones' Spirit of Vengeance, and battled Ketch. Thankfully, Alejandra, possessing the body of a village girl, Imara, and the other villagers, helped Ketch in fight, while Carnage's cult got their leader. Afterwards, Ketch apologized to Alejandra, but she thanked him for protecting her village before returning to hell. Ketch them promised to the village to come to protect them in need before leaving.

Powers and abilities 

While transformed, Danny exhibits much of the same powers as Johnny Blaze; supernatural strength, heightened reflexes, and a resistance to injuries that makes him effectively immortal to all but otherworldly weapons such as those forged in Heaven or Hell. Like Blaze, Ketch can inflict the Penance Stare through eye contact. Uniquely, Danny has been seen to be able to control the degree of trauma his Stare inflicts; such as when he freed Wolverine from mind control by making him relive the pain and sorrow he inflicted during a single day of his time as a soldier during World War I.

For instance, when it is thrown it is able to separate into individual links which behave like shuriken, later reintegrating and returning to the Ghost Rider's hand. The chain can grow in length, is supernaturally strong, and can transform into other weapons such as a spear. He can also spin it fast to be used as a drill.

The common theme of the Ghost Rider is a human host who transforms into a flaming-headed motorcyclist with supernatural powers. When riding their bikes, the vehicles can travel faster than conventional motorcycles and can maneuver impossible feats such as riding straight up a vertical surface or across water. In a one-shot comic featuring Doctor Strange and the Daniel Ketch/Noble Kale version of Ghost Rider, it was shown to be capable of riding on nothing but air. This was repeated shortly after Kale started to regain his memories, causing him to alter his suit by sheer force of will, and create an entirely new bike.

When empowered, Ketch's motorcycle undergoes a more radical transformation. It changes from a conventional looking motorcycle to one that appears powerful and high-tech. Along with flaming wheels, the bike includes a shield-like battering ram on the front. Ghost Rider also created two other bikes that he could utilize in the same manner as the one he normally rode, one out of necessity when Blackheart stole the original in a crossover graphic novel that brought together Ghost Rider, Wolverine, and the Punisher, and again in the regular series as a spare in case something made him unable to get to his regular cycle. The latter would wind up in the hands of Johnny Blaze.

He has displayed some other powers briefly, like the ability to summon a wall of flame. In the beginning, Ketch could only transform "when innocent blood was spilled" and had to touch the gas cap of his motorcycle. Later it was revealed that this was only a psychological limitation he imposed on himself, and which he later overcame.

He possessed hellfire powers similar to the Zarathos/Blaze version, but he also had the ability to destroy the undead and was supposedly the incarnation of the angel of death and judgement, which detailed the supposed origins of the Noble Kale version of the Ghost Rider.

In addition, Ketch and Noble Kale worked together to an extent, unlike Blaze and Zarathos, who battled for dominance and control over their shared body. Kale had a compassionate side and while there were times that he seemed tempted to simply take over completely, he refused to do so, though he felt anger at condemning Daniel to only being able to live his life out half the time, while he dominated the other half. Kale and Ketch, like Blaze and Zarathos, could sometimes communicate through dreams, and in at least one issue communicated via messages written on a mirror in lipstick.

Other versions

Ultimate Marvel
In the Ultimate Marvel reality, Danny Ketch, known as "The Ghost" was a master spy and one of the many newest recruits of General Nick Fury's Howling Commandos in order to battle Reed Richards and his Dark Ultimates, who violently started remolding the world their own shape. He is entirely normal in his appearance but has the ability to breathe fire. During the events of Cataclysm, he sacrificed himself to save those infected by MODOK and the Gah Lak Tus virus and destroy the City of Tomorrow. Though his body died, his consciousness was placed in a mechanical body by S.H.I.E.L.D. to create the Machine Man.

Marvel Zombies 
In the alternate-dimension Marvel Zombies universe, the Daniel Ketch version of Ghost Rider is seen in his living form in the Marvel Zombies prequel Dead Days. He is part of the resistance organized by Nick Fury to take down the Marvel Zombies but is later seen being overwhelmed in a battle with the infected. In the Marvel Zombies miniseries, a zombified version of Ghost Rider appears as one of the infected superheroes trying to attack and devour the Silver Surfer and part of the zombified superhero attack on Dr. Doom's fortress. It is suggested that he did not survive the attack of the Silver Surfer as he no longer appears with the survivors in the aftermath. He later resurfaces in Marvel Zombies 3 as part of Kingpin's undead alliance and tries to attack Machine Man. He is dispatched quickly when Machine Man slices his head off and steals his motorcycle to evade the zombies.

Marvels 
Danny Ketch appears on the last page of the Marvels series where he is shown as a young newspaper delivery boy. The main character of Marvels, Phil Sheldon, refers to him as "A nice, normal, ordinary boy" and has a picture taken of him as a symbol of ordinary humanity.

Spider-Man/Human Torch 
A younger version of Ketch is seen during the third issue of the Spider-Man/Human Torch miniseries written by Dan Slott. He is interviewed about Spider-Man and the Human Torch, and is approximately the same age as his appearance in Marvels.

New Fantastic Four 
In a reality where the Fantastic Four were killed, Ketch joins Spider-Man, Wolverine, and the Hulk in forming the new Fantastic Four, the group defeating—among other foes—a new Frightful Four consisting of Venom, Sandman, Sabretooth, and the Abomination which has been brought together by Doctor Doom and given enhanced powers by Mephisto. In the story's sequel, Ketch is one of the many heroes killed by Thanos' use of the Infinity Gauntlet, resulting in the other three team members recruiting Iron Man as a temporary replacement.

In other media

Television 
 Danny Ketch / Ghost Rider makes a non-speaking cameo appearance in the X-Men season one finale, "The Final Decision", within Gambit's memories.
 Danny Ketch / Ghost Rider appeared in the Fantastic Four episode "When Calls Galactus", voiced by Richard Grieco.
 Danny Ketch / Ghost Rider appeared in The Incredible Hulk episode "Innocent Blood", voiced again by Richard Grieco.
 John Semper, a producer and story editor of Spider-Man, said in an undated interview that one episode outline involved Spider-Man and Ghost Rider fighting Mysterio and Dormammu, and that the producers "wanted to introduce Ghost Rider, but Fox was afraid Marvel was going to use him in a UPN show and didn't want to give him the exposure. So that was cut".

Video games 
 Danny Ketch / Ghost Rider appears as a guest assist character in Venom/Spider-Man: Separation Anxiety.
 Danny Ketch / Ghost Rider was intended to star in a self-titled video game by Crystal Dynamics, but the game was ultimately cancelled.

Collected editions 
Ghost Rider: Resurrected (Ghost Rider vol. 3 #1–7)
The New Fantastic Four: Monsters Unleashed (Fantastic Four #347–349)
X-Men & Ghost Rider: Brood Trouble in the Big Easy (Ghost Rider vol. 3 #26–27 and X-Men #8–9)
Wolverine and Ghost Rider in Acts of Vengeance (Marvel Comics Presents #64-70)
Rise of the Midnight Sons (Ghost Rider vol. 3 #28, 31; Ghost Rider/Blaze: Spirits of Vengeance #1, Morbius #1, Darkhold #1 and Nightstalkers #1)
Spirits of Venom (Web of Spider-Man #95–96 and Ghost Rider/Blaze: Spirits of Vengeance #5 – 6)
Ghost Rider: Danny Ketch – Addict (Ghost Rider: Danny Ketch #1–5; Ghost Rider Finale)
Ghost Rider: Danny Ketch Classic Vol. 1 (Ghost Rider vol. 3 #1–10)
Ghost Rider: Danny Ketch Classic Vol. 2 (Ghost Rider vol. 3 #11–20 and Doctor Strange: Sorcerer Supreme #28)

References

External links 
 Ghost Rider (Daniel Ketch) at Marvel.com
 Ghost Rider at Marvel Directory
 
Ghost Rider (1990) at Don Markstein's Toonopedia. Archived from the original on August 28, 2016.
 

Characters created by Howard Mackie
Comics characters introduced in 1990
Fictional chain fighters
Fictional characters from Brooklyn
Fictional characters with fire or heat abilities
Fictional characters with immortality
Fictional characters with superhuman durability or invulnerability
Danny Ketch
Mythology in Marvel Comics
Marvel Comics characters who can move at superhuman speeds
Marvel Comics characters with accelerated healing
Marvel Comics characters with superhuman strength
Marvel Comics demons
Marvel Comics superheroes
Merged fictional characters
Vigilante characters in comics